Paul Joseph Durin (3 January 1890 – 24 May 1953) was a French gymnast who competed in the 1908 Summer Olympics and in the 1920 Summer Olympics.

In 1908 he finished fifth with the French team in the team event. Twelve years later he was part of the French team, which won the bronze medal in the gymnastics men's team, European system event in 1920.

References

External links
 

1890 births
1953 deaths
French male artistic gymnasts
Olympic gymnasts of France
Gymnasts at the 1908 Summer Olympics
Gymnasts at the 1920 Summer Olympics
Olympic bronze medalists for France
Olympic medalists in gymnastics
Medalists at the 1920 Summer Olympics
20th-century French people